Unc-5 homolog C (C. elegans)-like is a protein in humans that is encoded by the UNC5CL gene.

References

Further reading 

Genes on human chromosome 6